The 2017 FIFA U-20 World Cup Final was a football match that was played on at the Suwon World Cup Stadium, Suwon, South Korea on 11 June 2017 to determine the champions of the 2017 FIFA U-20 World Cup. The final was contested by Venezuela and England. England won the match 1–0, winning the title for the first time. Dominic Calvert-Lewin scored his second goal of the tournament during the final, which turned out to be the only goal in the game. This was the first ever final for both England and Venezuela in the history of the tournament.

Background
This was England's first appearance and victory in the final of a global football tournament since their senior World Cup victory in 1966. Their previous best at the U-20 World Cup was third place in 1993.

For Venezuela it was only the second appearance at the U-20 World Cup, previously in 2009 they only managed to go as far as the second round.

Road to the final

Match

Summary
The final was played on 11 June 2017 at the Suwon World Cup Stadium in Suwon. England defeated Venezuela 1–0. The win gave England the first title in the tournament.

Dominic Calvert-Lewin scored the winning goal in the 35th minute when he finished from close range after his initial effort was blocked by Wuilker Faríñez, but the rebound fell into his path. He made no mistake with his second chance.

England goalkeeper Freddie Woodman made two vital saves in the second half. The first was a one-on-one opportunity for Sergio Córdova created by Yeferson Soteldo, and the second from the penalty spot from Adalberto Peñaranda.

The match was evenly contested throughout, with both sides hitting the woodwork, but it was England's evening in the end, as the Young Lions held on to become U-20 World Cup champions for the first time.

After the match, England forward Dominic Solanke, was named the player of the tournament and received the Golden Ball. Previous winner of the award include Diego Maradona, Lionel Messi, Paul Pogba and Sergio Agüero.

Freddie Woodman was named the best goalkeeper of the tournament and received the Golden Glove award.

Details

Statistics

Reaction in England 
England's win ended 51 years of waiting for a global tournament trophy. The senior England team watched the game from a laptop and applauded as the final whistle was blown.

See also
 2017 FIFA U-20 World Cup

References

External links
FIFA U-20 World Cup, FIFA.com

Final
2017
United Kingdom–Venezuela relations
England national football team matches
Venezuela national football team matches
Sports competitions in Suwon
June 2017 sports events in South Korea